Admiral Oliver may refer to:

David R. Oliver Jr. (born 1941), U.S. Navy rear admiral
Daniel T. Oliver (born 1945), U.S. Navy vice admiral
Geoffrey Oliver (1898–1980), British Royal Navy admiral
Henry Oliver (1865–1965), British Royal Navy admiral
James Harrison Oliver (1857–1928), British Royal Navy rear admiral
Robert Don Oliver (1895–1980), British Royal Navy vice admiral
Robert Dudley Oliver (1766–1850), British Royal Navy admiral

See also
Manuel Villar Olivera (1801–1889), Peruvian Navy rear admiral